Kellé Airport  is an airstrip serving the village of Kellé in the Cuvette-Ouest Department, Republic of the Congo.

See also

 List of airports in the Republic of the Congo
 Transport in the Republic of the Congo

References

External links
OpenStreetMap - Kellé
OurAirports - Kellé

Airports in the Republic of the Congo